Nzovu Airport  is an airstrip serving the village of Nzovu in Sud-Kivu Province, Democratic Republic of the Congo.

See also

Transport in the Democratic Republic of the Congo
List of airports in the Democratic Republic of the Congo

References

External links
 FallingRain - Nzovu Airport
 HERE Maps - Nzovu
 OpenStreetMap - Nzovu
 OurAirports - Nzovu

Airports in South Kivu